Ishitaa Anoop Gidwani (born May 9, 1992 in Hong Kong) is Hong Kong cricketer who played for Hong Kong women's national cricket team as a captain. She made her debut for Hong Kong women's national cricket team against Pakistan women's national cricket team in 2006.

She has repented Hong Kong at the 2010 Asian Games , and captained the side at the 2014 Asian Games.

She retired from International cricket in 2016, after representing Hong Kong for 10 years. She currently plays for Hong Kong Cricket Club. Her father and uncle are umpires of the game and her mother is a scorer.

References

External links 
 

1992 births
Living people
Hong Kong people
Hong Kong women cricketers
Indian emigrants to Hong Kong
Hong Kong people of Indian descent
Cricketers at the 2010 Asian Games
Cricketers at the 2014 Asian Games
Asian Games competitors for Hong Kong